Minuscule 895 (in the Gregory-Aland numbering), ε3062 (von Soden), is a 13th-century Greek minuscule manuscript of the New Testament on parchment. It has marginalia. The manuscript has survived in complete condition.

Description 

The codex contains the text of the four Gospels, with a commentary, on 239 parchment leaves (size ). The text is written in one column per page, 22 lines per page.

There is also a division according to the smaller Ammonian Sections (in Mark 237 sections, the last section in 16:5), whose numbers are given at the margin, with references to the Eusebian Canons (written below Ammonian Section numbers).

Text 
The Greek text of the codex is a representative of the Byzantine. Hermann von Soden classified it to the textual family Kx. Kurt Aland did not place it in any Category.

According to the Claremont Profile Method it represents the textual family M10 in Luke 1 and Luke 20. In Luke 10 no profile was made.

History 

According to C. R. Gregory it was written in the 11th or 12th century. Currently the manuscript is dated by the INTF to the 13th century.

The manuscript was added to the list of New Testament manuscripts by Gregory (895e).
Formerly it was also classified as minuscule 2366 on the list of the New Testament manuscripts.

It is not cited in critical editions of the Greek New Testament (UBS4, NA28).

The manuscript is housed at the Princeton University Library (Garrett 7), in Princeton.

See also 

 List of New Testament minuscules (1–1000)
 Biblical manuscript
 Textual criticism
 Minuscule 894

References

Further reading 

Evans, Helen C. & Wixom, William D. (1997), The glory of Byzantium: art and culture of the Middle Byzantine era, A.D. 843-1261, no. 50, New York, The Metropolitan Museum of Art,

External links 
 

Greek New Testament minuscules
13th-century biblical manuscripts